William Hayden House may refer to:

William Hayden House (Tecumseh, Michigan), listed on the National Register of Historic Places (NRHP) in Lenawee County
William Hayden House (Albany, Vermont), listed on the NRHP in Orleans County

See also
Hayden House (disambiguation)